Fakhr ol Din (also Romanized as Fakhr ol Dīn and Fakhr od Dīn; also known as Fakhred Dīn) is a village in Badranlu Rural District, in the Central District of Bojnord County, North Khorasan Province, Iran. At the 2006 census, its population was 822, in 175 families.

References 

Populated places in Bojnord County